Porto Real is a municipality located in the Brazilian state of Rio de Janeiro. Its population was 19,974 (2020) and its area is 50.9 km2.

References

Municipalities in Rio de Janeiro (state)